Las Trincheras, also known as Las Trincheras de Aguas Calientes, is a locality near Valencia, Venezuela. It is noted for its hot springs, which feed into the Aguas Calientes River.

The name Trincheras (Spanish for "trenches") is said to derive from fortifications constructed in the colonial era.

History

Visit of Humboldt
The springs were visited by Alexander von Humboldt in 1800 during his expedition to the American tropics. They were known to the locals and Humboldt noticed that sick people were taking steam baths there.

On his return to Europe, Humboldt made Las Trincheras known to science. There was no evidence of vulcanism in the area to explain what was heating the water. The work of François Arago on the geothermal gradient helped Humboldt to develop the idea that the springs obtained their heat from very deep groundwater circulation.

Battle of Las Trincheras
Las Trincheras is also noted for a battle which took place in October 1813 during the Venezuelan War of Independence. The Spanish commander Juan Domingo de Monteverde was wounded in the battle which was won by the Independentist forces.
The Spanish retreated to their base at Puerto Cabello.

Railway infrastructure
The development of the springs as a resort (balneario in Spanish) was given a boost by the arrival of the Puerto Cabello and Valencia Railway in the 1880s. A station was opened at Las Trincheras, but the railway closed in the 1950s as road transport became more important in Venezuela.

In the 21st century a new railway is being built connecting Puerto Cabello to La Encrucijada in Aragua. Among the tunnels on the line is the 7,702 m Bárbula Tunnel, between Las Trincheras and Naguanagua, which has been described as the longest in South America.

References

Hot springs of Venezuela
Defunct railway stations in Venezuela
Populated places in Carabobo
Spanish colonial fortifications in Venezuela